Linderniella is a genus of flowering plants belonging to the family Linderniaceae.

Its native range is Tropical and southern Africa. It is found in the countries of Angola, Benin, Burkina, Burundi, Cameroon, Central African Republic, Chad, Congo, Eswatini, Ethiopia, Ghana, Guinea, Guinea-Bissau, Ivory Coast, Kenya, Liberia, Madagascar, Malawi, Mali, Mozambique, Namibia, Niger, Nigeria, Rwanda, Senegal, Sierra Leone, South Africa (Free State, KwaZulu-Natal and Northern Provinces), Sudan, Tanzania, Togo, Uganda, Zambia, and Zimbabwe.

The genus name of Linderniella is in honour of Franz Balthasar von Lindern (1682–1755), French doctor and botanist in Strasbourg and also university botanical garden director. It was first described and published in Willdenowia Vol.43 on page 227 in 2013.

Known species
According to Kew:
Linderniella andongensis 
Linderniella bolusii 
Linderniella boutiqueana 
Linderniella brevidens 
Linderniella cerastioides 
Linderniella gracilis 
Linderniella hartlii 
Linderniella horombensis 
Linderniella mbalaensis 
Linderniella nana 
Linderniella pulchella 
Linderniella pusilla 
Linderniella pygmaea 
Linderniella trichotoma 
Linderniella ugandensis 
Linderniella wilmsii

References

Linderniaceae
Lamiales genera
Plants described in 2013
Flora of Africa